Ferdinand Brunner (1 May 1870, Vienna - 30 November 1945, Vienna) was an Austrian landscape painter.

Life and work 
At the age of fourteen, he was apprenticed to the court theatre painters, Carlo Brioschi, Hermann Burghart and Johann Kautsky. After 1891, he studied at the Academy of Fine Arts, Vienna, in the master class of Eduard von Lichtenfels. He was awarded the Academy's Gundel-Prize for excellence in 1894 and became a member of the Vienna Künstlerhaus in 1901. 

His major exhibitions include the International Art and Horticulture Exhibition (1904) and the German National Art Exhibition (1907), both in Düsseldorf, as well as several showings at the Glaspalast in Munich. In 1910, he received the Großen Goldenen Staatsmedaille.

Rural scenes in Lower Austria, Bohemia and Hungary were his favorite motifs. His works may be seen at the Vienna Museum, the Lower Austria Museum, and in the gallery at the Vienna Academy.

Sources 
 "Brunner, Ferdinand". In: Allgemeines Künstlerlexikon. Die Bildenden Künstler aller Zeiten und Völker (AKL). Vol. 14, Saur, 1996, p. 564
 Heinrich Fuchs: Ferdinand Brunner. Malerischer Entdecker des Waldviertels, Wien 1979
 Heinrich Fuchs: Die österreichischen Maler des 19. Jahrhunderts, Band 1 (A–F), Wien 1972
 Rupert Feuchtmüller: Ferdinand Brunner. Katalog anlässlich der Gedächtnisausstellung zur 100. Wiederkehr seines Geburtstages im Niederösterreichischen Landesmuseum, Wien 1970

External links 

 More works by Brunner @ ArtNet
 

1870 births
1945 deaths
Austrian painters
Austrian landscape painters
Academy of Fine Arts Vienna alumni
Artists from Vienna